Corvinone is a red Italian wine grape variety native to the Veneto region of northern Italy. Seldom found in wine alone, Corvinone is blended, along with Rondinella, Molinara and other autochthonous varieties, in Corvina-dominant red wines of the Valpolicella and Bardolino regions of Veneto. Corvinone is similar enough to the more widespread Corvina variety that it has historically often been mistaken as a clone; indeed its name in Italian suggests a meaning of "large corvina". More recent ampelographical work and DNA profiling has shown it to be a separate variety, however.

Viticulture and winemaking 

Corvinone produces winged pyramidal bunches, larger and more loosely packed than Corvina, and ripening later (mid-October). Individual grapes of Corvinone are larger too, making the variety suitable for drying, part of the winemaking process for several Valpolicella wine styles, most notably Amarone and Recioto. Since the 1990s, Corvinone has become more important in the blending of these red wines. Most sources say the blend is Corvina, Rondinella and Molinara, often omitting Corvinone because it was not always recognised as a separate variety. It has become more popular with winemakers than Molinara due to its denser colour and superior flavours.

References 

Wine grapes of Italy
Wine grapes of Veneto
Red wine grape varieties